Elanda (Ĵılandu) is a rural locality (a selo) in Chemalskoye Rural Settlement of Chemalsky District, the Altai Republic, Russia. The population was 154 as of 2016. There are 2 streets.

Geography 
Elanda is located in the valley of the Katun River, 26 km south of Chemal (the district's administrative centre) by road. Tolgoyek is the nearest rural locality.

References 

Rural localities in Chemalsky District